The Woman in the Window may refer to:

 The Woman in the Window (1944 film), a film directed by Fritz Lang
 The Woman in the Window (2021 film), a Joe Wright-directed adaptation of the Finn novel
 The Woman in the Window (novel), a 2018 thriller novel by A. J. Finn